Eupithecia novata is a moth in the family Geometridae. It is found in Iran and Turkey.

References

Moths described in 1904
novata
Moths of the Middle East
Moths of Asia